Felipe Silva Correa dos Santos (born 3 January 1997), commonly known as Felipe Santos, is a Brazilian footballer who plays for Gabala as a winger.

Career
On 1 July 2021, Keşla FK announced the signing of Santos.

Career statistics

Club

References

1997 births
Living people
Footballers from São Paulo
Brazilian footballers
Association football wingers
Sociedade Esportiva Palmeiras players
Paulista Futebol Clube players
NK Ankaran players
NK Maribor players
Shamakhi FK players
Gabala FC players
Slovenian PrvaLiga players
Azerbaijan Premier League players
Brazilian expatriate footballers
Brazilian expatriate sportspeople in Slovenia
Expatriate footballers in Slovenia
Brazilian expatriate sportspeople in Azerbaijan
Expatriate footballers in Azerbaijan